The 2011 Omiya Ardija season is Omiya Ardija's seventh consecutive season in J. League Division 1. It also includes the 2011 J. League Cup, and the 2011 Emperor's Cup.

Players

Competitions

J. League

League table

Results summary

Results by round

J. League Cup

Emperor's Cup

References

Omiya Ardija
Omiya Ardija seasons